Rakhesh Singh Kshetrimayum (born 1978), FIET, SMIEEE is an electrical engineer, educator and Professor in the department of Electronics and Electrical Engineering, Indian Institute of Technology Guwahati. Recently, he was listed in the world's top 2% scientists for the year 2021   by the researchers from Stanford University. Earlier in 2021 and 2020, he was also listed in the world's top 2% scientists for the year 2020  and 2019.

Biography 
He earned his first class BTech degree in Electrical Engineering from the Indian Institute of Technology Bombay in 2000 and his Ph.D. degree from the School of Electrical and Electronics Engineering, Nanyang Technological University Singapore in 2005. His doctoral advisor was Lei Zhu. He is currently a Professor of EEE at the Indian Institute of Technology Guwahati and was the former Head of Center for Career Development 
from April 2018 to March 2020. Prior to joining Indian Institute of Technology Guwahati in September 2005 as a faculty member, he did Postdoctoral research from the department of Electrical Engineering, Pennsylvania State University USA from May–July, 2005 under mentorship of Raj Mittra and the department of Electrical Communication Engineering, Indian Institute of Science Bangalore from October 2004-February 2005 under guidance of K. J. Vinoy. During August 2000-July 2001, he worked with Mphasis as a software engineer.

He is currently serving as an Editor of IEEE Communications Letters, an Associate Editor of IEEE Open Journal of Antennas and Propagation  and served as an editorial board member of IEEE Transactions on Microwave Theory and Techniques from 2005 to 2007. He has served on the organizing committees of several IEEE conferences in various capacities, such as a General Chair of the National Conference on Communications (NCC) 2023, TPC Chair (communications track) of the NCC 2016, TPC Co-chair of IEEE Applied Electromagnetics Conference (AEMC) 2015. He has been in the technical program committee of IEEE International Conference on Communications (ICC), Global Communications Conference  (GLOBECOM), Asia Pacific Microwave Conference, etc. He is well known for his research works in the areas of MIMO wireless including MIMO antennas and spatial modulation. Some of his recent invited talks are in  IEEE Asia-Pacific Conference on Applied Electromagnetics (APACE),
IEEE Texas Symposium on Wireless and Microwave Circuits and Systems,  IEEE International Symposium on Antenna Technology and Applied Electromagnetics (ANTEM) and IEEE India Council International Conference (IEEE INDICON).

Awards and honors 

His awards and honors include:

• Fellow of the Institution of Engineering and Technology (IET)

• Senior Member of IEEE

• Fellow of IETE

• Fellow of IEI

• Life Fellow of Optical Society of India (OSI)

• Life Fellow of Antennas Test & Measurement Society of India (ATMS)

• IETE S. K. Mitra Memorial Award, 2017

• IETE M. Rathore Memorial Award, 2015

• IEEE ANTS 2017 Best Paper Award (Third Prize)

Published works 
Kshetrimayum has written the following books:

 R. S. Kshetrimayum, Fundamentals of MIMO Wireless Communications, Cambridge University Press, 2017.
 B. Kumbhani and R. S. Kshetrimayum, MIMO Wireless Communications over Generalized Fading Channels, CRC Press, 2017.
 A. Bhowal and R. S. Kshetrimayum, Advanced Spatial Modulation Systems, Springer Nature, 2021.

Kshetrimayum has written or co-written the following articles:

References

External links 
 https://www.iitg.ac.in/krs/

1978 births
Living people
Fellows of the Institution of Engineering and Technology
Senior Members of the IEEE
IIT Bombay alumni
Nanyang Technological University alumni
Academic staff of the Indian Institute of Technology Guwahati
Scientists from Manipur
Indian scientific authors